František Staněk (born 24 April 1944) is a Czech coxswain who represented Czechoslovakia. He competed at the 1960 Summer Olympics in Rome with the men's coxed pair where they were eliminated in the round one repêchage.

References

1944 births
Living people
Czechoslovak male rowers
Olympic rowers of Czechoslovakia
Rowers at the 1960 Summer Olympics
People from Jindřichův Hradec
Coxswains (rowing)
Sportspeople from the South Bohemian Region